Burtsboro is an unincorporated community in Lumpkin County, in the U.S. state of Georgia.

History
A post office called Burtsboro was in operation from 1893 until 1929. The community derives its name from Ray and W. J. Burr, local merchants.

References

Unincorporated communities in Lumpkin County, Georgia
Unincorporated communities in Georgia (U.S. state)